Hougham can refer to:

Places
Hougham, Lincolnshire, a village in England
Hougham railway station
Hougham Without, a civil parish in Kent, England, whose settlements include Church Hougham and West Hougham, collectively known as Hougham
Hougham Battery, a World War II coastal defence battery

Other uses
John S. Hougham (1821–1894), Purdue University's first appointed professor
Robert de Hougham (died 1274), a governor of Rochester Castle

See also
Huffam, a name